Dai County, also known by its Chinese name Daixian, is a county in Xinzhou, Shanxi Province, China. Its county seat at Shangguan is also known as Daixian. The county is the home of the AAAAA-rated Yanmen Pass Scenic Area along the Great Wall, as well as the Bianjing Drum Tower, the Ayuwang Pagoda, and the Zhao Gao Forest Park.

Names 
As is usual in Chinese, the name "Daixian" is used for both the county as a whole and for the county seat at Shangguan. Because the English word "county" only typically describes the area, it's more common to use a transcription of the Chinese form of the name when talking about its seat of government. The same name was formerly written as Tai County, Tai Hsien, or Tai-hsien in the Wade-Giles system. The name was most recently bestowed in 1912, during the organization of the Republic of China.

The county took its name from its predecessor Daizhou or Dai Prefecture, which had existed since AD585. This name was formerly written as Tai Chou or Tai-chou in Wade-Giles and as Taichow or TaichowSha by the Chinese Post Office. Daizhou had taken its name from the recently abolished Dai Commandery, despite having never been part of it or the seat of the earlier "Dai" regions. Dai Commandery had been created by the Zhou state of Zhao to organize its northeastern conquests and was based in the former capital of the Baidi Kingdom of Dai. It became known as Daixian as well but was near present-day Yuzhou in Hebei. Its name was used for the rump kingdom of Zhao established by Prince Jia to oppose Qin in the 220sBC; after the fall of Qin, there was a Dai among Xiang Yu's Eighteen Kingdoms and the Han Empire's princely appanages. These included the commanderies of Yunzhong and Yanmen in northern Shanxi along with the old Dai homeland in northwestern Hebei, spreading the name westward into Shanxi.

The earlier name for the county had been Guangwu ("Broad-&-Martial"), with its eponymous county seat located southwest of present-day Shangguan. It was also known as Yanmen (after the nearby pass) once the seat of Yanmen Commandery was moved to Guangwu from Yinguan (near present-day Shuozhou, Shanxi) under the Kingdom of Wei during China's Three Kingdoms Period. These names followed the posts when they moved to Shangguan under the Northern Wei. It ceased to be called Guangwu in 589 at the creation of Yanmen County; it ceased to be called Yanmen after that county was abolished under the Yuan. The town was also briefly known as Sizhou under the Northern Zhou and early Sui after Si Prefecture was relocated to Shangguan in 579 from its original seat northwest of Xinzhou. Present day villages of New Guangwu and Old Guangwu along with the Guangwu section of the Great Wall are located in adjacent Shanyin County.

Geography
It lies in northeastern Shanxi Province between Taiyuan to the south and Datong to the north, with the Yanmen Pass forming a natural choke point which once controlled access to central Shanxi from the Eurasian Steppe. (The pass is still used by the G208, although the larger Erguang Expressway now passes to its west.)

The main river is the Hutuo. Its principal tributaries within the county are the E ( É Hé), the Zhongjie ( Zhōngjiě Hé), the Yukou ( Yùkǒu Hé), the Guangou (t s Guāngōu Hé), and the Qili ( Qīlǐ Hé).

The highest points are the Heige Tajian ( Hēigē Tǎjiān) and Mantou Mountain (t s Mántoushān). Parts of the chains belonging to Mount Heng to the north and Mount Wutai to the east also reach Dai County.

Climate

History

Ancient China

Present-day Dai County lies to north of the historic heartland of ancient Chinese civilization in the Fen, Wei, and Yellow River valleys. The Chinese knew their northern neighbors as the Di or "Northern Barbarians". The "White Di" (Baidi) are recorded originating in north Shaanxi west of the Yellow River but had settled in the Hutuo Valley by the 6th centuryBC.

The Zhou state of Jin pushed sporadically northward through both invasions and bribery of the Di's ruling class until its disintegration at the end of the Spring and Autumn Period. King Yong (posthumously known as the "Wuling" or "Martial-&-Numinous King") of the Jin successor state of Zhao adopted nomad-style clothing, equipment, and cavalry tactics in 307BC; in campaigns in 306 and 304BC overran the Loufan (t s Lóufán) and "forest nomads" ( Línhú) of the Hutuo Valley and the lands to the northwest of the Yanmen Pass, opening up to the Eurasian steppe. He organized these conquests together with Zhao-held Dai as the three commanderies of Yunzhong, Yanmen, and Dai. He protected them by erecting long earthen barricades along what is now considered the Outer Great Wall, as well as a fortress overlooking Yanmen Pass in present-day Dai County. The town of Guangwu, southwest of present-day Shangguan, was established under the Zhao as well.

After Qin's conquest of Zhao in 228BC, its Prince Jia tried to reëstablish his family's kingdom in its northern commanderies; this "Kingdom of Dai" was quickly overrun by the Qin general Wang Ben in 222BC, just prior to the reunification of China.

Imperial China

Under the First Emperor's rule, an administrative overhaul abolished China's former states and provinces, making the relatively small commanderies the highest level of regional government. Zhao's former holdings in northern Shanxi west of MountHeng formed Qin's Yanmen Commandery, with its seat at Shanwu in present-day Youyu County. The frontier walls of the former states, including Zhao's, were merged into the first form of the Great Wall of China. Guangwu was promoted to the seat of its own county, overseeing the parts of present-day Dai County in the Hutuo Valley. This was part of the Taiyuan Commandery under the Qin and Western Han, when it was part of the province of Bingzhou. Under the Eastern Han and Wei, the area was part of Yanmen Commandery, whose seat was at Mayi (present-day Shuozhou).

The county seat of Guangwu moved to what is now Shangguan under the Northern Wei. An earthen wall 8 li in circumference was raised to protect the town. It became the seat of Dai Prefecture in 585 during the Sui, eventually taking its name as Daizhou. The prefecture covered parts of the present-day counties of Dai, Fanshi, Wutai, and Yuanping. The Ayuwang Pagoda was also first constructed under the Sui, but suffered repeated fires; the present Tibetan-style dagoba dates to the Yuan. The town was also known as Yanmen during this period, as it was the seat of the Yanmen Commandery. On 11 September 615, the Sui emperor Yang Guang (posthumously known as the Yang or Lazy Emperor) was besieged there by the Eastern Turkish (Tujue) leader Shibi Khan, who was angry about Chinese efforts to weaken and divide his realm. In his distress, Yang Guang promised promotions and rewards to the garrison and those who might rescue him. Credit became muddled, however, when the khan's Chinese wife Princess Yicheng responded to his pleas by sending a false report to her husband about an attack on the Turkish homeland. After the Turks withdrew, the emperor chose to renege on most of his promises; the event built animosity in the Chinese army ahead of the collapse of the Sui.

Dai Prefecture was reëstablished under the Tang, who made it part of their Hedong Circuit. In the spring of 623, the Eastern Turkish Jiali Khan and the Chinese rebels Gao Kaidao and Yuan Junzhang (Yuan Jūnzhāng) jointly besieged the Tang fortress there but were unable to take it. Chinese censuses recorded the district had 36,234 people living in 9,259 households in AD639 and 100,350 living in 21,280 households in 742.

From 1369 until about 1375, under the early Ming, Dai Prefecture was briefly reorganized as a county. It was during this time that the present fortifications at Yanmen Pass were constructed, and the earthen walls at Shangguan were given a brick façade. Dai Prefecture was administered under the Ming and early Qing as part of the circuits of Yanmen (t or  s Yànmén Dào) or Yanping  Yànpíng Dào), but it was directly administered by the provincial government after 1724 until near the end of the dynasty, when it was returned to Yanping Circuit. Daizhou was the site of a Protestant mission run by the Baptist Missionary Society. The nascent Christian community was, however, devastated in 1900 by the Boxer Rebellion and subsequently by the memory of its powerlessness to defend itself.

Modern China
Following the Xinhai Revolution, the Republic of China reorganized Dai Prefecture as a county in 1912. This was originally under Yanmen Circuit; in 1921, it was placed directly under Shanxi's provincial government. During the Second Sino-Japanese War (WWII), various locations in Dai County saw action during the 1937 Battle of Xinkou. This ended in a Japanese victory but guerrilla actions continued. Following the Communist victory in the Chinese Civil War, Dai County was placed under Xinzhou Prefecture. In 1958, it was merged with Fanshi County, but this arrangement was ended in 1961. In 2001, the county seat Chengguan (t s Chéngguānzhèn) changed its name to Shangguan and some of Dai County's smaller townships were merged to form larger units. Shangtian and Baicaokou merged to form Yanmenguan; Bata joined Tanshang; Xijiao joined Nieying; Jiaokou joined Xingao; Fenshuiling joined Huyu; and Hujiatan joined Shangmofang.

Administrative divisions
Since 2001, Dai County has been divided into six towns and five townships:

These 11 township-level divisions are in turn divided into eight residential communities and 377 villages (2015). The county seat is at Shangguan, with the main offices located on its East Main Street (t s Dōng Dàjiē).

Demographics
During the 2010 census, there were 214,091 residents in the county.

Tourism

Yanmenguan Township is home to the Yanmen Pass Scenic Area, a mountain pass bearing a major fortress along the Great Wall that has been given a AAAAA rating by the China National Tourism Administration. The area has been strategically important and fortified since the Warring States Period, although the present works date to the 14th century during the early Ming.

Other tourist attractions in Dai County include the Ayuwang or Ashoka Pagoda, a dagoba dating to the Yuan; the Daizhou Confucian Temple
(t s Dàizhōu Wénmiào); the Bianjing Drum Tower (t s Biānjìnglóu); the Yang Ancestral Hall (t s Yángjiā Cítáng); the Zhao Gao National Forest Park (t s Zhào Gǎo Guān Guójiā-Jí Sēnlín Gōngyuán); and the Dongduanjing Archeological Site (t s Dōngduànjǐng Yízhǐ).

Transportation

Buses connecting the county seat Daixian to the East Passenger Station of the provincial capital Taiyuan run about every 30 minutes. Daixian is also connected by daily buses running to Datong's Xinnan Passenger Station.

See also
 Realms of Dai during the Spring & Autumn, Warring States, and Sixteen Kingdoms Periods of Chinese history
 Prince of Dai, an appanage during the Han

Notes

References

Citations

Bibliography
 .
 .
 .
 
 .
 .
 . 
 .
 .
 .
 .
 .
 .

External links

 Official site  

County-level divisions of Shanxi
Xinzhou